You to Me, Me to You is a 1976 Soviet comedy film directed by Aleksandr Sery.

Plot 
The film tells about the twin brothers, one of whom enjoys comfortable life in Moscow, being a banya employee who has "influential" clients, and the other works as a fishing inspector in his native village. But suddenly a disaster happened, and the first had to replace the second.

Cast 
 Leonid Kuravlyov as Ivan Kashkin / Sergei Kashkin
 Tatyana Pelttser as Lyuba (as T. Pelttser)
 Alla Meshcheryakova as Vera (as A. Meshcheryakova)
 Svetlana Svetlichnaya as Valya (as S. Svetlichnaya)
 Yuri Medvedev as Stepan (as Yu. Medvedev)
 Valery Nosik as Grisha (as V. Nosik)
 Roman Tkachuk as Pantykhov (as R. Tkachuk)
 Evgeniy Shutov as Baturin (as E. Shutov)
 Ilya Rutberg
 Valentina Kareva as Katya (as V. Kareva)

References

External links 
 

1976 films
1970s Russian-language films
Soviet comedy films
1976 comedy films